Orthognathini is a tribe of true weevils in the family of beetles known as Curculionidae.

Genera
These genera belong to the tribe Orthognathini:
 Mesocordylus
 Orthognathus Schönherr, 1838 i c g b
 Sipalinus
Data sources: i = ITIS, c = Catalogue of Life, g = GBIF, b = Bugguide.net

References

Further reading

 
 
 
 
 
 
 
 
 
 
 
 
 

Dryophthorinae